The Devil's Promise is a 2014 mystery pastiche novel written by David Stuart Davies, featuring Sherlock Holmes and Dr. John Watson.

Titan Books published the book in 2014, as part of its Further Adventures series, which collects a number of noted Holmesian pastiches.

Plot
While investigating a mysterious corpse on a deserted beach, Holmes and Watson are attacked by the strange inhabitants of the nearby village. Then, Watson wakes up only to find that many months have passed and Holmes' behaviour is extremely odd. What had happened at that village, and what is its connection to the infamous "Devil's Companion" that so shook Holmes?

See also
 Sherlock Holmes pastiches

External links
The Devil's Promise at Titan Books

2014 British novels
England in fiction
Sherlock Holmes pastiches
Sherlock Holmes novels
Titan Books titles